The historic Govind Dev Ji temple of Gaudiya Vaishnavism tradition is situated in City Palace of Jaipur in Rajasthan, India. The temple is dedicated to Govind Dev (Krishna) and his consort Radha. The deities of the temple were brought from Vrindavan by Raja Sawai Jai Singh II, the founder of Jaipur. This Vaishnav temple is considered to be one of the most sacred and significant temple for devotees.

Legend 

According to the popular legend, the image of Govind Devji is also called "Bajrakrit" because it was created by Bajranabh – The great grand son of Krishna. Around 5,000 years ago when Bajranabh was around 13 years old, he asked his Grand mother (daughter-in-law of Krishna) as to how Krishna looked like. Then based on her description, he made three images. In first image, the feet show the resemblance with the Krishna's feet. In second image, chest area looked like Krishna's. In third image, the face showed complete resemblance with Krishna's face when he was incarnated on Earth.

The first one image is known as Lord "Madan Mohan ji". The second image is called as "Gopinath ji" and the third image is popular with the name of "Govind Devji". With the passing of ages, these pious divine images were also lost. Some 500 years ago, Vaishnavite saint and preacher, Sri Chaitanya Mahaprabhu asked one of his disciples to excavate the idol of Govinda, which had been buried to protect it from the invaders.

For Vaishnavites, Sri Radha Govind Dev ji temple is one of the most important temple outside Vrindavan.

In this temple, "Aartis" and "Bhog" are offered seven times a day when the deity is unveiled for "Darshan". Thousands of devotees visit the temple daily and an even larger number visit during Janmashtami.

Timing 

In Govind Devji temple, aartis are performed seven times a day. At that time devotees can have a darshan of deities Radha Govind ji.

See also 
 Madan Mohan Temple, Karauli
 Radha Krishna

References

External links
 Rajasthan tourism website
 Govind Dev Ji Temple official website

Hindu temples in Rajasthan
Tourist attractions in Jaipur
Hindu temples in Jaipur
Radha Krishna temples